Wyoming Attorney General is the title of the senior legal officer of the State of Wyoming. The attorney general is appointed by the Governor.

The 38th and current attorney general is Bridget Hill.

Attorneys general of Wyoming

References

External links
 Wyoming Attorney General official website
 Wyoming Attorney General articles at ABA Journal
 News and Commentary at FindLaw
 Wyoming Statutes at Law.Justia.com
 U.S. Supreme Court Opinions - "Cases with title containing: State of Wyoming" at FindLaw
 Wyoming State Bar
 Wyoming Attorney General Peter K. Michael profile at National Association of Attorneys General
 Press releases at Wyoming Attorney General
 

Attorneys General